María Claudia Dammert Herrera (17 August 1949 – 5 November 2017) was a Peruvian actress and comedian.

Biography
Claudia Dammert was born in San Isidro District, Lima on 17 August 1949, the daughter of María Silvia Herrera Drago and Luis Dammert Muelle. She was the great-granddaughter of Juan Luis Dammert Amsink and the philanthropist Juana Alarco de Dammert, granddaughter of Francisco Dammert Alarco, niece of politician , second niece of Eduardo Dibós Dammert, and second cousin of politician and sociologist Manuel Dammert.

She studied at Colegio Villa María, and after graduation she earned a degree in communication arts at Lindenwood University in Saint Charles, Missouri.

In the 1960s she ventured into the theater, appearing in productions in Lima, Miami, Washington, D.C., Havana, Madrid, and Caracas. She became the first woman to put on one-person shows in Peru.

During the military government of Juan Velasco Alvarado, Dammert mounted a one-woman play in which she expressed ideas against the revolution, for which she was briefly jailed.

In 1981, she appeared with Paloma San Basilio and Patxi Andión in the musical Evita, produced in Madrid.

In 2000, Dammert appeared in the high-profile film Proof of Life with Meg Ryan and Russell Crowe. That year, she participated as a political activist, opening the Four Quarters March against the Fujimori government.

After living in the Ancash mountains for ten years, supporting the strengthening of the Andean identity and worldview with intercultural radio and TV programs, she returned to the theater in 2009 with her one-woman show Más verde que nunca. In 2010, she acted in the plays August: Osage County and Cómo vivir sin un hombre y no morir en el intento.

Dammert, along with 49 other Peruvian artists, was honored for her career with the Lima Medal in a ceremony organized by the municipality in December 2010.

In 2011, she returned to television in the telenovela , and appeared in the film The Bad Intentions. She finished the year with her performance as the two mothers of Chronicle of a Death Foretold by Gabriel García Márquez, which was selected to represent Peru at the Ibero-American Theater Festival in Bogotá in March 2012.

In 2012, she presented the one-woman show Psicomedia. She reprised this the following year as Psicomedia ¡alto voltage!, with the character Patricia Pardo de Prado.

In 2017, Claudia Dammert presented the play Tu madre, la Concho. She died from a heart attack later that year, on 5 November.

Her daughter  is an actress, radio announcer, and YouTuber.

Filmography

Film
  (1980) as Nurse
 Proof of Life (2000) as Ginger
 Cuando el cielo es azul (2005) 
 The Bad Intentions (2011)
 La herencia (2015)
  (2015)
  (2016) as Marialicia
  (2017)
 Gemelos sin cura (2017)

Television
 La Fábrica (1972)
 Matrimonios y algo más (1983)
 Carmín (1984) as Liliana
 Rosa de invierno (1988)
 Mala mujer (1991)
 Energía todo el día, presenter
  (2011) as Gina Calori

Theater
 Evita (1981) (Madrid)
 El ritual de la salamandra (1982) as Evilia (Washington, D.C.)
 Diamantes en almíbar (1984)
  (1985)
 Coser y cantar (1986) (Washington, D.C.)
 Extraño juguete (1986) as Ángela (Washington, D.C.)
 Agnes de Dios (1988)
  (1991)
  (1996) as Chunga (Washington, D.C.)
 Gala en el Watergate (1997) (Washington, D.C.)
 Quíntuples (1998) as Dafne, Bianca, and Carlota Morrison (Washington, D.C. and Havana)
 Claudia hace historia.... Y crea histeria (1992) (Peru, Venezuela, and Cuba)
 Yo Claudia... Yo mujer 
 Terapia de grupo para amargados colectivos
 Candidaza al 2000 (2000) Patricia Pardo de Prado
 Más verde que nunca (2009)
 August: Osage County (2010) as Violeta
 Cómo vivir sin un hombre y no morir en el intento (2010)
 La pequeña fiesta (2011)
 Chronicle of a Death Foretold (2011) as Plácida Linero and Pura Vicario
 Lúcido (2012) as Teté
 Psicomedia (2012) as Mani, Linda, Domi, Barbie, and Martirio
 Psicomedia ¡Alto voltaje! (2013) as Patricia Pardo de Prado
 Akaloradas (2013-2014)
 Mujeres de ceniza (2015)
 Reglas para vivir (2016) as Edith
 Atrévete a ser feliz (2016)
 Tu madre, la Concho (2017)

References

External links

 

1949 births
2017 deaths
Actresses from Lima
Lindenwood University alumni
Peruvian film actresses
Peruvian stage actresses
Peruvian telenovela actresses
Peruvian women comedians
Stand-up comedians